York Park is a sports ground in the Inveresk and York Park Precinct, Launceston, Australia. Holding 19,000 people, York Park is known commercially as University of Tasmania (UTAS) Stadium and was formerly known as Aurora Stadium under a previous naming rights agreement signed with Aurora Energy in 2004. Primarily used for Australian rules football, its record attendance of 20,971 was set in June 2006, when Hawthorn Football Club played Richmond Football Club in an Australian Football League (AFL) match.

The area was swampland before becoming Launceston's showgrounds in 1873. In the following decades the grounds were increasingly used for sports, including cricket, bowls and tennis. In 1919, plans were prepared for the transformation of the area into a multi-sports venue.  From 1923, the venue was principally used for Australian rules football by the Northern Tasmanian Football Association, and for occasional inter-state games. Visiting mainland football clubs regularly played mid-season or end-of-season matches at the ground. Other sports such as cricket, tennis, bowling, cycling and foot-racing have been played at the venue.

Hawthorn has played between two and five AFL matches each season since 2001, and the St Kilda Football Club played two games a year between 2003 and 2006. In 2007, the Tasmanian Government signed a $16.4 million, five-year sponsorship deal with Hawthorn, under which the club will play four regular season games and one National Australia Bank Cup pre-season match at the venue each year. The venue hosted its first VFL/AFL finals during the 2021 AFL finals series.

Throughout its history, York Park has hosted major pop concerts and other entertainments. Since 2001 it has been a venue for international sports events, and in 2005 was redeveloped at a cost of $23.6 million. On 21 February 2009 York Park became home to the Tasmanian Football Hall of Fame.

History
The area now known as York Park was originally "swampy, sour, and choked with weeds". After European settlement, it was used for landfill before becoming the Launceston showgrounds in 1874. By 1881,  of land (now York and Invermay Parks) had been taken over by the Launceston City Council "for the purpose of recreation, health and enjoyment". The area was ready to be used for two cricket games by the end of 1886. Cricketers were full of praise for the ground, but because winter rain caused it to become waterlogged, footballers (Australian rules) were often unable to use the facility.

At a council meeting in July 1901, one member, Alderman Storrer, proposed that Inveresk Park be renamed York Park in honour of the Duke of York (later King George V), who visited Tasmania during the Federation celebrations of 1901. The proposal was passed 4–2, although another member, Alderman Sadler, noted that "Launceston was well known as a loyal community and did not need to change the park's name" to prove their fidelity to the monarchy. A bowling green and tennis courts were completed by 1910, along with the main oval which was used for state school sports.
In 1919, the council held a competition for the design of the York Park sports ground, the winner to receive £20. The final design had to include two full sized tennis courts, a bowling green, a cycling track, cricket and football grounds with dressing rooms and facilities for spectators. Although not fully complete, York Park was officially opened by the St Andrews Caledonian Society on 1 January 1921. A cycling track surrounding the perimeter fence was in use by September of the same year.
On 4 May 1923 The Examiner reported on that "Work on the grandstand was completed for the opening of the 1923 football season, when the game was transferred from the NTCA Ground to York Park. Work on the grandstand and the seating round the oval has been proceeded with at top speed, and spectators at the game tomorrow should have little to complain of." The first game between teams representing the northern and southern halves of Tasmania took place at the oval in August 1923 in front of a crowd of 9,441. A reporter from The Examiner commented: "The oval is in good order and well grassed and the new motor mower copes with the latter very effectively under favourable conditions. The whole five acres can be cut in six hours, as compared with twenty hours by the horse mower." When the ground was harrowed, glass and other debris would surface; a contemporary observer, John Orchard, later remembered: "they'd line up a whole group of people, perhaps thirty or forty players, and we'd go along with a container alongside each other and we'd pick up everything that was likely to hurt a player."

Heavy floods in 1929 caused substantial damage to the ground, destroying the cycling track, which was subsequently rebuilt. In the 1930s the Launceston Football Club, who played regularly at the ground, won six consecutive premierships before World War II intervened. As a consequence of the war NTFA matches were canceled after the 1941 season, not to resume until May 1945. Three years later, 12 ornamental trees were planted at the ground, in memory of NTFA players who had lost their lives in the war.

In 1960, York Park was the venue of a football match in which Tasmania defeated Victoria for the first time. The match was attended by a record crowd of approximately 15,000. Four years later, the southern stand (demolished in 2004) was completed. In the 1970s another stand was added, capable of holding 650 spectators and incorporating sales kiosks and committee rooms.

Up to 1999 York Park had remained a sports ground used predominately for local events, generally attracting modest crowds; according to ground manager Robert Groenewegen, supporters were able to "park [their] car[s] next to the boundary fence".
However, before the 1998 federal election the local member of parliament (MP) representing the Division of Bass, Warwick Smith—a minister from the ruling Liberal Party—promised public funding for the redevelopment of York Park. Although Smith lost his seat, the Liberals retained power and kept the promise. The $6.4 million redevelopment completed in 2000 was the first major phase in the process of raising the ground to Australian Football League (AFL) standard. Work included the construction of the Gunns Stand, a two-level grandstand originally holding 2,500 (now extended to 5,700) which incorporates corporate facilities.

In 2003, the Government of Tasmania allocated $2 million to erect a roof above 6,000 terrace seats, in readiness for the 2003 Rugby Union World Cup; this meant that almost all of the seating area was protected from the weather. In 2004, the ground became known as Aurora Stadium as the result of six-year naming rights sponsorship deal with Aurora Energy.
During 2006, the state government supplied $150,000 for new gates and ticket boxes at the stadium entry. The gates were later named after recently deceased Tasmanian Premier Jim Bacon. These gates, and the heritage-listed Northern Stand, have been placed on the Tasmanian Heritage Register as culturally significant to the state. The two-storey Cameron-Tyson stand was in 2005, replaced by an extension of the Gunns Stand.

In March 2008, an arson attack destroyed part of the Northern Stand, causing between $300,000 and $500,000 damage. In December 2008 the Launceston City Council proposed a $7 million development for a replacement Northern Stand. The project includes the relocation of the old Northern Stand's heritage roof into part of the redevelopment of facilities at Invermay Park. The old structure at York Park will be replaced with a 2,125-seat grandstand which will include three AFL compliant changerooms, an AFL umpire changeroom, a corporate facility for 936 people in corporate boxes, suites and function rooms, coaches boxes, along with statistician, timekeepers and print media rooms. Post-match press conference, drug testing, and radio rooms will also be included. The stand has increased the ground's capacity to 21,000 and the seating capacity to 13,825. These works were designed by Tasmania-based architects Philp Lighton Architects. The Australian Government was expected to contribute  $4 million, the Tasmanian Government $2 million and Launceston City Council $500,000. The Hawthorn Football Club are currently asking for a "sizeable" contribution from the AFL towards the development, and Inveresk Precinct Authority chairman Robin McKendrick has indicated that a contribution of $1 million was possible.

On 22 October 2016, the University of Tasmania bought the naming rights to the stadium for a five-year contract that would take effect on 1 January as the university campus would sit next to York Park, bringing an end to a 13-year partnership with Aurora Energy.

In March 2022 Tasmanian Premier Peter Gutwein announced the government intended to expand the seating capacity of the stadium to 27,500 and install retractable seating for rectangular sports. The development will occur within the following five years, provided the state government's $65 million contribution is matched by the federal government and the stadium's ownership is transferred from the Launceston City Council to the state government-run Stadiums Tasmania agency.

Sports and events

Australian rules football

Australian rules football is the main sport played at the stadium which has hosted Australian Football League (AFL) games since 2001, when the state government started paying interstate clubs to relocate their home games. Melbourne-based Hawthorn played one game in 2001 and two in 2002, and in 2003 were joined by another Melbourne team, St Kilda. In 2004, it was estimated that the cost to the government per game was between $300,000 and $500,000, but Tasmanian Premier Jim Bacon stated that the government was making a profit on its investment, estimating that each game injected between $1 million and $1.5 million into the Tasmanian economy.

The number of AFL matches peaked in 2006, when Hawthorn played three home games and one pre-season game, while St Kilda played two home games. The games drew an average crowd of 17,108, with a record attendance of 20,971 for the match between Hawthorn and Richmond.

Controversy occurred at York Park when, in a game between St Kilda and Fremantle, the final siren was too quiet to be heard by any of the umpires; play was restarted in error, and in the subsequent confusion St Kilda levelled the scores. After a protest, the AFL Commission convened and overturned the result, awarding Fremantle the victory. The stadium's sirens were replaced, and the old ones were put on display at the Queen Victoria Museum and Art Gallery.

In 2007 York Park benefitted from a five-year, $16.4 million sponsorship of Hawthorn by the state government. Under the sponsorship agreement the stadium is the venue for five of Hawthorn's matches each year—one pre-season and four premiership games. Hawthorn president Jeff Kennett has expressed interest in his club playing higher profile teams, such as Collingwood, at the stadium.

As well as being an AFL venue, York Park is the long-term base of North Launceston, and thus hosts regular Tasmanian State League matches. The ground also hosted occasional Tasmanian Devils Football Club home games in the Victorian Football League, from 2001 until the club's demise in 2008.

Other uses
York Park hosted its first international sporting fixture in the group phase of the 2003 Rugby Union World Cup, when Romania and Namibia played in front of 15,457 spectators. As a soccer venue the stadium has hosted one National Soccer League match and three A-League pre-season games. Melbourne Knights and Perth Glory played a national league match at the stadium during the 2001–02 NSL season. In July 2006, after the A-League replaced the NSL, the stadium hosted Tasmania's first A-League match when Melbourne Victory and Adelaide United played in the pre-season competition. In 2007, 8,061 attended the corresponding match, which has since become a regular fixture. In addition to pre-season matches, Aurora Stadium has also hosted regular season A-League matches: on 1 February 2012, Melbourne Victory played Gold Coast United FC in a regular season A-League game in front of a crowd of 5,268 people and on 12 January 2013, Melbourne Victory played against Central Coast Mariners in front of a crowd of 6,238 people. Inveresk Precinct Authority chairman Robin McKendrick has stated that ground authorities are attempting to win hosting rights for Australian national soccer team matches. On 30 December 2017, the ground played host to its first ever Big Bash League match when the Hobart Hurricanes took a home game to York Park with the Sydney Thunder being their opponents. The Thunder won by 57 runs in front of 16,734 fans.
Western United FC are playing two home matches in 2021.

Among non-sporting events, before its redevelopment the stadium hosted an Ike & Tina Turner concert and a Billy Graham religious revival meeting. The Crusty Demons performed at the stadium during 2006 and March 2008.
Elton John performed at York Park during his Rocket Man Solo Tour at the end of 2007; this remains his only appearance in Tasmania as of August 2009.

Structures and facilities

York Park is an oval-shaped grassed arena surrounded by several different stands, the largest being the two-tier Gunns Stand on the ground's western side. The stand originally had a capacity of 2,500, which was increased by an extension in 2005 to 5,700.
The stand has two corporate box areas, the Gunns Function Centre and the Corporate Function Centre.
Immediately north of the Stand is the Aurora Function Centre, which also houses coaches' boxes,
and is next to the heritage listed Northern Stand connecting the Northern, Southern and Eastern Terraces. The stands have a collective capacity of 6,000, bringing the ground's total seating to 11,700.
The Railway Workers Hill is a small, uncovered stand located at the eastern side of the ground between the Northern and Eastern Terraces. The ground has a parking capacity of approximately 2,500, from the use of large grassy areas at the adjacent Inveresk site, with an option of street parking.

York Park has often been criticised for its large playing surface, which is blamed for producing unattractive low-scoring football. Prior to the start of 2009, only 11 of 28 matches saw a score beyond 100 points. For a pre-season match in 2009, 13 metres of width was removed from the outer wing "in a bid to produce more attractive games." Before the match, Groenewegen said, "Because that outer wing was so wide, once they [a team] chipped wide out there it was very easy for teams to flood back because you were so far away from the goals." The ground is also known for its strong wind, which hinders the accuracy of long-distance kicks that are propelled high into the air.

A grant of $50,000 from the Tasmanian Community Fund in 2005 helped the Launceston City Council and AFL Tasmania construct a permanent Tasmanian Football Hall of Fame at York Park. The ground was chosen as the site because it is regarded as the home of Australian rules football in Tasmania. AFL Tasmania initiated the Hall of Fame nomination process, and since 2005 various clubs, players and grounds have been inducted. The Hall of Fame opened to the public on 21 February 2009. As of May 2009, $23.6 million had been spent re-developing the stadium.

Crowds

The ground's record attendance is 20,971, at an AFL match between Hawthorn and Richmond on 18 June 2006. This match occurred before the Northern Stand was damaged and the stadium's capacity reduced. An AFL match between Hawthorn and St Kilda on 8 August 2009 saw a capacity crowd of 20,011, the largest crowd since the fire.

The highest recorded attendance for an interstate match at York Park is 15,000 for the 1960 clash between Tasmania and Victoria.

The highest recorded attendance for a Tasmanian Football League match at York Park is 6,755 for the 1989 Second Semi Final played between North Launceston and North Hobart on 2 September 1989.

The highest recorded attendance for a soccer match is 8,061, when Melbourne Victory played Adelaide United on 16 July during a 2007 A-League Pre-Season Challenge Cup match. The Billy Graham religious revival meeting on 17 March 1959 attracted 17,000 attendees, a record for a non-sporting event at the ground.

Attendance records

Top 10 sports attendance records

Last updated on 1 January 2012

Sources
 AFL Attendance Records

Notes
References using The Examiner may require subscription for access.

References

External links

Australian Football League grounds
Rugby union stadiums in Australia
Soccer venues in Tasmania
Rugby World Cup stadiums
Sports venues in Tasmania
Buildings and structures in Launceston, Tasmania
Sports venues completed in 1921
Sport in Launceston, Tasmania
Women's Big Bash League
Tasmanian Heritage Register
AFL Women's grounds
1921 establishments in Australia